The Merano derailment occurred on 12 April 2010 when a train derailed between Latsch and Kastelbell, near Merano, Italy, after running into a landslide, causing nine deaths and injuring 28 people.

Accident

At 9:03 local time (7:03 UTC), a two passenger coach Stadler GTW train, operated by STA Südtiroler, derailed in Kastelbell-Tschars after running into a landslide. Nine people died when the train derailed, and 28 others were injured, seven seriously.

The landslide which reportedly derailed the train is believed to have been caused by a burst irrigation pipe, or by a valve inadvertently left open. The train was on a regional service, travelling between Mals and Merano, on the Vinschgau line, which reopened in 2005.

Italy's ANSA news agency said one of the train's three carriages was filled with mud from the landslide, and rescuers were digging frantically with shovels and pickaxes to try to reach the victims. A reporter for Sky Italia television said smoke was rising from the wreckage and helicopters were flying overhead.

The railway is equipped with advanced sensors to stop trains in case of landslides, but they could not operate because the mud fell at the moment that the train was passing.

An investigation is underway into why the irrigation pipe burst. The local aqueduct consortium denies the possibility that the landslide was caused by the pipe, as it is a small pipe (65 mm diameter), and was working perfectly until about 8:00 CEST.

References

External links

Photographs of the accident (BBC)
 Interactive graphic of the accident (La Repubblica)
Video (Corriere TV)

2010 in Italy
History of South Tyrol
Railway accidents in 2010
Derailments in Italy